Human Collateral is a 1920 American silent drama film directed by Lawrence C. Windom and starring Corinne Griffith, Webster Campbell and Maurice Costello. It is now considered to be a lost film.

Cast
 Corinne Griffith as 	Patricia Langdon
 Webster Campbell as 	Roderick Duncan
 Maurice Costello as 	Richard Morton
 William T. Carleton as 	Stephen Langdon
 Charles Kent as 	Malcolm Melvin
 Alice Calhoun as 	Beatrice Bruswick

References

Bibliography
 Connelly, Robert B. The Silents: Silent Feature Films, 1910-36, Volume 40, Issue 2. December Press, 1998.
 Munden, Kenneth White. The American Film Institute Catalog of Motion Pictures Produced in the United States, Part 1. University of California Press, 1997.

External links
 

1920 films
1920 drama films
1920s English-language films
American silent feature films
Silent American drama films
American black-and-white films
Films directed by Lawrence C. Windom
Vitagraph Studios films
1920s American films